Father Time is a BBC Books original novel written by Lance Parkin and based on the long-running British science fiction television series Doctor Who. It features the Eighth Doctor and introduces the Doctor's adopted daughter Miranda.

External links
The Cloister Library - Father Time

2001 British novels
2001 science fiction novels
Eighth Doctor Adventures
British science fiction novels
Novels by Lance Parkin
Fiction about amnesia